, known by her stage name , is a Japanese singer, songwriter, and "poetry rapper". Her musical style mixes influences from J-pop, rap, post-hardcore, experimental pop, art rock, and electronica. She is currently based in Tokyo.

Life and career
Kimishima grew up in the Isogo Ward of Yokohama, Japan.

In early life, the artist mentions that she was "like a child of emptiness itself" without being able to understand herself until she had started to make music in high school and gradually started to recognize her emotions. When Kimishima was 17, she formed a duo band with her friend playing the synths and learned how to make tracks. After disbanding the band, Kimishima began her career as Haru Nemuri when she was 21.

2016–2017: Sayonara, Youth Phobia and Atom Heart Mother 
In October 2016, Haru Nemuri made her debut by releasing her first mini-album Sayonara, Youth Phobia.

In June 2017, her second mini-album Atom Heart Mother was released. The release event took place at Shibuya Loft 9 in Tokyo. In September, she release her first double A-side single “Hello@New World / Torikobo Sareta Machi Kara Ai wo Komete” which was written in collaboration with Japanese singer-songwriter Mariko Goto. On October 26, Nemuri held her first one-man live titled "Boku wo Saishuu Heiki ni shita nowa Kimi sa" at Musashino Kokaido, Tokyo.

2018–2019: Haru to Shura
Haru Nemuri released her first full album "Haru to Shura", was released on April 11, 2018 and gained international attention. Realizing that her music was being internationally accepted, Nemuri became active in reaching out to her international audiences and performed her first oversea show in Taiwan at the Spring Scream 2018. Nemuri continued to promote the album through shows and events in Tokyo. In August, she released her EP "kick in the world" which had been written for the MOOSIC LAB 2017 exhibition movie "eternal/spring movie". "kick in the world" was quickly highlighted internationally, where Stereogum  chose the songs as its number 1 song  of "THE 5 BEST SONGS OF THE WEEK". She continuously released two digital single titled "i wanna" in September and "Tokyo (Ewig Wiederkehren)" which was a rearrange version of "Tokyo" on "Sayonara, Youth Phobia" in October. Nemuri returned to Taiwan in October to perform a show at the 巨獸搖滾音樂祭 8.0 BEASTIE ROCK FESTIVAL. "Haru to Shura" was ranked 27 in the world that year on America's largest collaborative music rating website Rate Your Music, which was the highest ranking for among any Japanese artist at the time.

One year after its release, "Haru to Shura" became available in vinyl throughout Europe as it was released through the French label, Specific Recordings. Between March and April 2019, Haru Nemuri took off on her first Asian tour with Mariko Goto titled "Hello! Ni Hao! Konnichiwa! ASIA TOUR 2019" with shows in Hong Kong, Shanghai, Beijing, Taiwan and the final show being held in Tokyo. From May to June, she had went on her "Haru to Shura" European Tour 2019" performing 14 shows including live performances at the Primavera Sound 2019 held in Spain, Nippon Connection Film festival 2019 and the Wilwarin Festival 2019 in Germany. Along with 15 artists including Xiu Xiu and iglooghost, Nemuri had joined The Needle Drop's curated compilation "The Needle Drop: Various Artists" with her track "Kick In The World(alternate version)" which was released in October.

2020–present: Lovetheism and Shunka Ryougen
On January 10, 2020, she released the single "Fanfare". The music video for the single was shot under extreme temperatures over the frozen Amur River in Russia. In March, the single "Riot" was released. The music video of "Riot" that was filmed at the Russian Circus in Moscow was also revealed . On March 20, the mini-album titled "Lovetheism" was released.  In March, Nemuri was scheduled to perform at South by Southwest, but the festival was cancelled due to COVID-19. In place of the cancelled show, she held a livestream performance on YouTube called "Unused VISA" on March 23. During the same month, it was announced that her new song titled "Seventh Heaven" was going be featured as the theme of the upcoming Japanese movie, Colorless (Japanese: Sarugakucho de Aimasho). In June, Nemuri shared the music video of "Trust Nothing but Love" (Japanese title: Ai Yori Tashika na Mono Nante Nai). On June 10 (Juneteenth) Nemuri released a fund raise single titled "Heart of Gold (DEMO)" through her Bandcamp site in support for the Black Lives Matter protest movement with all sales being donated to the NAACP (The National Association for the Advancement of Colored People).

Haru Nemuri released "bang" on January 15, 2021 which was produced in two contents both Tokyo and Los Angeles. The music video for "bang" was also released where the whole production had been done remotely online between Tokyo and Los Angeles and was filmed in Skid Row Downtown Los Angeles. Nemuri shared a long statement about the song and the inspiration behind it, in which she discusses social division and the hope she finds in ‘praying’. On March 21, she had made an appearance on the SXSW Online 2021 with a full one shot take show from Tokyo. This performance had been highlighted by the New York Times and Nemuri being chosen as one of their "15 Best Acts" from the festival.  Within the same month, the single "Inori Dake Ga Aru" was released. Nemuri later mentioned in a interview that she wrote the song without having the plan to have it released because it was written when she was going through a catastrophically rough time with death in mind and wrote this song with only prayers of saving herself. "Seventh Heaven" The theme song of the movie, Colorless (Japanese: Sarugakucho de Aimasho) was released as a single on May 28. Nemuri followed up with another single titled "Old Fashioned" in July  along with a music video that includes English subtitled lyrics that directly expressed her anger and resignation to society. On October 1, Nemuri released the single "Déconstruction" which was co-produced with the producer duo MyRiot. Nemuri explained "It’s a song for all souls to be so noble. When you fight for your soul, this song is for you.” She further explained "We should destroy that structure,” as a way of overturning the dichotomous way of thinking that had been prevalent in Western philosophy up to that point. I felt that this was what our world needs right now."

In March 2022, Haru Nemuri had went on her first North American tour that had been postponed four times due to the pandemic. The tour had kicked off with a performance in New York, Chicago, San Francisco, Los Angeles, and Dallas which all shows on the tour had successfully sold out. Nemuri also appeared at SXSW music festival 2022 and had been praised as one of "The Best Music We Saw at SXSW" by Austin Chronicle and Paste Magazine. Nemuri had also appeared on stage with Pussy Riot performing the song "Police State", stunning the crowds. Returning from her North American tour, Nemuri surprise released the single "Ikiru" as the lead single from her upcoming new album. A part of Shuntaro Tanikawa's literary work "Ikiru" is quoted in the song by poetry reading, being used with direct permission from the Tanikawa himself. The music video of "Ikiru" starring Japanese actress Ruka Ishikawa was also released. When asked in her interview, Nemuri stated "Ikiru is about when you feel that momentary notice that you can still be alive. I wrote it when I felt that moment and made it into a song from the bottom of my heart. But it was really tough when I sung it today... I usually live my life forgetting about that feel, so every time I sing or listen to it, it makes me think that there are moments like this in life…but”.

On April 22, Haru Nemuri had released her second full album, Shunka Ryougen, which contained twenty-one songs including all singles released from 2021 to 2022.  Shunka Ryougen had been critically acclaimed and received a high rate of 8.0 on Pitchfork and the news had widely spread over into Japan. The album had been chosen as one of "The Best Progressive Pop Music of 2022" by Pitchfork and one of the "50 More Great Albums of the Year" by SPIN. On September 13, Haru Nemuri held a kick off party for her "SHUNKA RYOUGEN NORTH AMERICA TOUR 2022" at Space Odd Shibuya in Tokyo, Japan In October, she embarked on her "SHUNKA RYOUGEN TOUR" in North America which included a show at the POP Montreal Festival, Toronto, and thirteen shows in the United States. After the third show on the tour, Nemuri tested positive for COVID-19 and several shows were postponed. The tour restarted from Dallas, Texas. Returning from the States the tour continued into East Asia where she performed at the Maho Rasop Festival in Thailand, Bangkok, and Okinawa, Japan

Critical response 
Anthony Fantano of the The Needle Drop reviewed her debut album "Haru to Shura", mentioning that "Haru Nemuri's debut album pushes J-pop/rap in an exciting direction by channeling Japan's rich history of underground rock music."

HARU NEMURI's Shunka Ryougen had been hailed by Pitchfork ("Blending elements of J-pop, rap, and hardcore, the experimental Japanese artist’s latest album presents a convincing balance of nihilism and hope."), and also from The Fader, Spectrum Culture ("Nemuri looked to the balance of life and death and represents their intersection. That’s why the album is as celebratory as it is volcanic), Stereogum ("We named genre-exploding Japanese musician Haru Nemuri, who mixes pop, rock, and hip-hop into her own beautifully experimental cocktail, one of the best new artists of 2018."), and Ones to Watch ("Treasure. We are constantly looking for it and by its very nature it remains elusive....everything about Haru Nemuri is comfortably atypical."). SPIN stated "Rather than merely recreate her debut, Haru Nemuri chose deconstruction for her second album. The word appears throughout Shunka Ryougen’s song titles, and it’s key to how the record reconfigures Nemuri’s blend of art rock, noise pop, and hip-hop"

Artistry

Influences
Haru Nemuri has mentioned Shimura Masahiko (Fujifabric), Seiko Oomori, Shinsei kamattechan, Björk, and Susumu Hirasawa as her major influences. She also mentions Fugazi had taught her what hardcore is and The Clash and Yeah Yeah Yeahs showed her that “rock ’n’ roll can exist as art”. She also mentioned Rage Against the Machine had taught her “Art exists in a dimension that is inseparable from society and (thanks to them) I learned how to think about that responsibility.” Nemuri expressed her love in Aurora's music and contacted the producer duo MyRiot who worked with the artist to co-produce Nemuri's song  "Déconstruction".

She has covered some of her influences' songs, including "Police State" by PussyRiot which she mentioned was another huge inspiration (Nemuri performed the song with PussyRiot at the Flood Fest held at SXSW 2022).

Ideology and themes
Nemuri has touched on her ideology in regards to punk; she believes it is about love, anger, and even kindness itself, and living in this world and society, where she personally feels that it is inevitable or very natural to be associated with feminism. She has introduced herself as a "riot grrrl", which she believes is "one of the few 'names' that I feel I can use my energy to live with or fight against the inconveniences and biases that come from advocating it." On her interview with Japanese media Natalie, she mentioned "Within myself, my music is inherently pernicious and cannot be harmless to everyone. If it is treated as harmless by bias or prejudice, I think that's not right, and would like everyone to touch it as such." Nemuri often uses the word "Rock 'n' Roll" in her lyrics and mentioned, "I think that rock'n'roll is something that continues to become new all the time. Change is a very scary thing, but if you don't continue to update, in the true sense you won't be able to be kind."

Discography

Studio albums

Mini albums

EPs

Singles

Featured songs

Extended Plays

Awards and nominations

APPLE VINEGAR MUSIC AWARD 
"APPLE VINEGAR -Music Award-" is a work award given to albums released by up-and-coming musicians launched in 2018 by Masafumi Gotoh, the front man vocalist of the Japanese band ASIAN KUNG-FU GENERATION.
! 
|-
| 2023
| Shunka Ryougen
| To be announced
| 
| 
|-

References

External links 

 HARU NEMURI's Official Website (World)
 HARU NEMURI's Official Website (Japan)
 HARU NEMURI on Instagram
 HARU NEMURI on Twitter
 HARU NEMURI on Spotify
 HARU NEMURI on Bandcamp (Specific Recordings)
 HARU NEMURI on Songkick
 HARU NEMURI on Apple Music
 HARU NEMURI on YouTube

1995 births
J-pop singers
Japanese electronic musicians
Japanese rappers
Japanese singer-songwriters
Japanese women hip hop musicians
Japanese women rock singers
Japanese women singer-songwriters
Living people
Musicians from Yokohama
Noise rock musicians
Post-hardcore musicians
Riot grrrl musicians